Stanley Maxwell O'Neill (6 January 1932 – 27 December 2010) was an Australian rules footballer who played with South Melbourne in the Victorian Football League (VFL).

O'Neill, described as a "rugged half-back", was about to debut for South Melbourne in Round 1 of the 1954 season when he broke a bone in his ankle in three places. He eventually returned to play with South Melbourne in 1957.

Notes

External links 

1932 births
Australian rules footballers from Victoria (Australia)
Sydney Swans players
2010 deaths